Bumpass, Virginia is an unincorporated community primarily in Louisa County.

Bumpass may also refer to:

Geography
Bumpass Mountain, in Lassen Volcanic National Park, California
Bumpass Hell, one of the Geothermal areas in Lassen Volcanic National Park

People
Kendall Vanhook Bumpass (1809–1885), an American miner
Rodger Bumpass (born 1951), an American actor